Tabarsi may refer to:
 Shaykh Tabarsi, a 12th-century Shia scholar
 Husain Noori Tabarsi, a 19th-century Shia scholar
 Battle of Fort Tabarsi, a 19th-century battle between Babis and the government forces